Sir David Wilson, 1st Baronet (4 April 1855 – 8 March 1930) was a Scottish landowner and agriculturalist.

Wilson was educated at the University of Glasgow, graduating MA and DSc. He was a working farmer and served on many agricultural committees, as well as on Stirlingshire County Council. He was created a baronet in the 1920 New Year Honours for his services to Scottish agriculture.

Footnotes

References
Obituary, The Times, 10 March 1930

1855 births
1930 deaths
People from Stirling
Alumni of the University of Glasgow
Scottish farmers
Baronets in the Baronetage of the United Kingdom
Councillors in Scotland
Scottish landowners
Scottish agriculturalists